The Brunel Awards are given to railway companies, to encourage outstanding visual design in railway architecture, graphics, industrial design and art, technical infrastructure and environmental integration, and rolling stock. The name is assigned to them in honour of Isambard Kingdom Brunel, founder of the Great Western Railway, and designer of the giant ship .

History
The Brunel Awards were first awarded in 1985, during the celebrations marking the 150th anniversary of the Great Western Railway.

Her Majesty Queen Elizabeth II of the United Kingdom presented the inaugural awards, at a ceremony in Bristol, England.

Categories
Beginning with the 2011 award ceremony, there have been five categories of award; the third category is new.

 Category 1: rail stations
 Category 2: technical infrastructure
 Category 3: freight and railroad support buildings
 Category 4: industrial design, corporate branding, graphics, furnishing
 Category 5: rolling stock

See also

List of architecture prizes

References

External links
 The Watford Group website, Brunel Awards page 
 The ninth Brunel Awards (2005) on the website of the organiser, the DSB.
 The tenth Brunel Awards (2008) on the website of the organiser the ÖBB.

1985 establishments in the United Kingdom
Awards established in 1985
British awards
Architecture awards
Design awards
Rail infrastructure in the United Kingdom
Rail transport industry awards
Isambard Kingdom Brunel
Awards disestablished in 2014